Burton Atkins Collins (June 14, 1909 – May 24, 1947) was an American baseball pitcher in the Negro leagues. He played with the Baltimore Black Sox in 1932. He attended Alabama State Teachers College.

References

External links
 and Seamheads

Baltimore Black Sox players
1909 births
1947 deaths
Baseball players from Alabama
Baseball pitchers
People from Bibb County, Alabama
20th-century African-American sportspeople